Schmendrick (שמענדריק) is Yiddish for an ineffectual, foolish, or contemptible person (OED), and may refer to:

 Shmendrik oder Die komishe Chaseneh (Schmendrik or The Comical Wedding), an 1877 play by Abraham Goldfaden
 Schmendrick the Magician, wizard from the fantasy novel The Last Unicorn